Aldo Ballarin (10 January 1922 – 4 May 1949) was an Italian footballer who played as a defender.

Club career
Ballarin played for five seasons (166 games, three goals) in Serie A for U.S. Triestina Calcio and Torino. With Torino, he won four Serie A titles.

International career
He made his debut for the Italy national football team on 11 November 1945 in a game against Switzerland.

Personal life
Aldo's younger brothers Dino Ballarin and Sergio Ballarin also played football professionally. To distinguish them, Aldo was referred to as Ballarin I, Dino as Ballarin II and Sergio as Ballarin III.

Death
Ballarin died with his brother Dino and most of the Grande Torino team in the Superga air disaster. The stadium in his hometown, in which A.C. Chioggia Sottomarina plays, was renamed in their honour.

Honours
Torino
 Serie A: 1945–46, 1946–47, 1947–48, 1948–49.

External links
 

1922 births
1949 deaths
Italian footballers
Italy international footballers
Serie A players
Serie C players
Rovigo Calcio players
U.S. Triestina Calcio 1918 players
Venezia F.C. players
Torino F.C. players
Association football defenders
Footballers killed in the Superga air disaster